Broome Heath is a   Local Nature Reserve in Ditchingham in Norfolk. It is owned by South Norfolk District Council and managed by the Broads Authority. An area in the north is designated a geological Site of Special Scientific Interest as Broome Heath Pit, and there is a Scheduled Monument in the middle.

This site in the valley of the River Waveney has marshy grazing land and lakes. At the southern end there is a Neolithic settlement, and in the middle there are long and round barrows.

There is access from Loddon Road.

References

Local Nature Reserves in Norfolk